Solara is the debut album by alternative rock band Cecimonster Vs. Donka from Lima, Peru.

Track listing

Personnel 
Band Members
 Sergio Saba – vocals, guitar
 Sebastian Kouri –  guitar
 Alonso García – bass guitar
 Patrick Mitchell – Drums

Additional personnel

 Saito Chinén – Production, engineering and mastering

References 

2011 debut albums
Cecimonster Vs. Donka albums